Sir William Henry Marsh    (1827–21 July 1906; Chinese Translated Name: 馬殊; 馬師 also infrequently used) was a British colonial administrator, who governed Hong Kong twice. The first tenure started in March 1882, and ended in March 1883, when Sir George Bowen succeeded him as the 9th Governor of Hong Kong. The second tenure started in December 1885, and ended in April, 1887, when Major-General William Cameron succeeded him as Colonial Administrator.

Memory
Marsh Road in Wan Chai, Hong Kong Island and Marsh Street in Hung Hom were named after him.

References

Chief Secretaries of Hong Kong
Governors of Hong Kong
1827 births
1906 deaths
Knights Commander of the Order of St Michael and St George
British colonial governors and administrators in Asia
19th-century Hong Kong people
19th-century British politicians